Christmas Howard Davies (25 December 1916 - 5 November 1987) was a Welsh international rugby union full-back who played club rugby for Llanelli and Swansea. He won six caps for Wales.

Rugby career
Davies was one of very few Welsh players to represent his country on either side of the Second World War. When he was first selected to play for Wales, he was playing club rugby for Swansea, having started his rugby career with Burry Port. His first international game was against Scotland as part of the 1939 Home Nations Championship under the captaincy of Wilf Wooller. Wales beat Scotland 11–3, and Davies was reselected for the very next match  at Ravenhill Stadium in Belfast against Ireland. Wales were victorious, but with the outbreak of World War II, this was the last match either team would play for eight years.

When international rugby was re-introduced, Davies, now playing for Llanelli, was one of only two capped players to be chosen for the first Welsh match in the 1947 Five Nations Championship against England; the other being captain Haydn Tanner. The England game would be the only Wales match that Davies appeared on the losing side, as the final three games of the tournament Wales and Davies were victorious.

International matches played
Wales
  1947
  1947
 Ireland  1939, 1947
  1939, 1947

Bibliography

References

Welsh rugby union players
Rugby union fullbacks
1916 births
1987 deaths
Swansea RFC players
Llanelli RFC players
Wales international rugby union players
Rugby union players from Llanelli